Ghar Sansar is a 1958 Hindi film starring Balraj Sahni, Nargis, Rajendra Kumar and Kumkum in lead roles.

Cast 
 Balraj Sahni as Kailash
 Nargis as Uma
 Rajendra Kumar as Deepak
 Kumkum as Jyoti
 Johnny Walker as Banke

Soundtrack
Ravi composed the music of the film, while lyricists Majrooh Sultanpuri and S. H. Bihari penned the songs.

References

External links
 

1958 films
1950s Hindi-language films
Films scored by Ravi